Soroush Saeidi; is an Iranian football defender who currently plays for Iranian football club Shahrdari Mahshahr in the Azadegan League.

Club career

Foolad
He started his career with Foolad from youth levels. He was promoted to the first team in summer 2011 and signed a four-year contract extension which kept him at Foolad until 2018. He made his debut for Foolad on November 22, 2014 against Saba Qom as a starter.

Club career statistics

References

External links
 Soroush Saeidi at IranLeague.ir

Living people
Iranian footballers
Foolad FC players
1991 births
Iran under-20 international footballers
People from Izeh
Association football defenders
Sportspeople from Khuzestan province